Extreme Tactics is a real-time strategy video game developed by American studio Media Station and published by Piranha Interactive Publishing for Windows in 1998.

Reception

The game received mixed to unfavorable reviews. Next Generation said, "Is the game truly unique? Not really. Is it fun to play and strangely addictive? Yes. It may not be all that different, but it will keep you entertained for hours."

References

External links
 

1998 video games
Multiplayer and single-player video games
Real-time strategy video games
Video games developed in the United States
Windows games
Windows-only games